Visa requirements for Guinean citizens are administrative entry restrictions by the authorities of other states placed on citizens of the Guinea. As of 2 July 2019, Guinean citizens had visa-free or visa on arrival access to 55 countries and territories, ranking the Guinean passport 89th in terms of travel freedom (tied with passports from Gabon, Rwanda, Senegal and Togo) according to the Henley Passport Index.

Visa requirements map

Visa requirements

Dependent, Disputed, or Restricted territories
Unrecognized or partially recognized countries

Dependent and autonomous territories

See also

Visa policy of Guinea

References and Notes
References

Notes

Guinea
Foreign relations of Guinea